Huaqiao is a railway station on the Shanghai–Nanjing intercity railway located in Kunshan, Suzhou, Jiangsu Province, China.

Railway stations in Shanghai
Stations on the Shanghai–Nanjing Intercity Railway